In computational linguistics, second-order co-occurrence pointwise mutual information is a semantic similarity measure. To assess the degree of association between two given words, it uses pointwise mutual information (PMI) to sort lists of important neighbor words of the two target words from a large corpus.

History
The PMI-IR method used AltaVista's Advanced Search query syntax to calculate probabilities. Note that the "NEAR" search operator of AltaVista is an essential operator in the PMI-IR method. However, it is no longer in use in AltaVista; this means that, from the implementation point of view, it is not possible to use the PMI-IR method in the same form in new systems. In any case, from the algorithmic point of view, the advantage of using SOC-PMI is that it can calculate the similarity between two words that do not co-occur frequently, because they co-occur with the same neighboring words. For example, the British National Corpus (BNC) has been used as a source of frequencies and contexts.

Methodology
The method considers the words that are common in both lists and aggregate their PMI values (from the opposite list) to calculate the relative semantic similarity.  We define the pointwise mutual information function for only those words having ,

The set , contains words  , 
, where   and

The -PMI summation function of a word is defined with respect to another word. For word  with respect to word  it is:

 

where  which sums all the positive PMI values of words in the set   also common to the words in the set . So, the -PMI summation function for word  with respect to word  having  and the -PMI summation function for word  with respect to word  having  are

 

and

 

respectively.

 

The normalization of semantic similarity algorithm returns a normalized score of similarity between two words.

References

 Islam, A. and Inkpen, D. (2008). Semantic text similarity using corpus-based word similarity and string similarity. ACM Trans. Knowl. Discov. Data 2, 2 (Jul. 2008), 1–25.
 Islam, A. and Inkpen, D. (2006). Second Order Co-occurrence PMI for Determining the Semantic Similarity of Words, in Proceedings of the International Conference on Language Resources and Evaluation (LREC 2006), Genoa, Italy, pp. 1033–1038.

Computational linguistics
Statistical distance